Ela or ELA may refer to:

Companies and organizations 
 Basque Workers' Solidarity, a trade union
 Earth Liberation Army
 ELA Aviación, a Spanish aircraft manufacturer
 English Lacrosse Association
 Equatorial Launch Australia, owner-operator of Arnhem Space Centre in northern Australia
 European Lift Association, a trade association
 European Laser Association, see Lasers in Medical Science
 European Labour Authority

Music
 E.L.A. (album), by Elastinen
 "Ela" (Barrice song), by Barrice
 Ela (Peggy Zina album), by Peggy Zina
 "Ela" (Andromache song), by Andromache; Cyprus' song for the Eurovision Song Contest 2022

People
 Ela (name), given name
 Ela (surname)

Places
 East Los Angeles, California, United States
 Eastside Los Angeles , United States
 Ela (woreda), now Konta, Ethiopia
 Ela, North Carolina, United States
 Ela Beach, in Port Moresby, Papua New Guinea
 Ela River, in New Hampshire, United States
 Ela Township, Lake County, Illinois, United States
 Parc Ela, a Swiss nature park
 Piz Ela, a mountain therein
 ELA-1 (Ensemble de Lancement Ariane), a rocket launch pad in French Guiana
 Experimental Lakes Area, in northwestern Ontario, Canada
 Nay Pyi Taw International Airport, formerly Ela Airport, in Myanmar

Other uses
 Elative case, in grammar
 Electronic Journal of Linear Algebra
 Emergency Liquidity Assistance
 English language arts
 Equilibrium line altitude, in an iceberg
 Error level analysis, the analysis of compression artifacts in digital data
 Experimental Lakes Area, in northwestern Ontario, Canada
 Ela (moth), a synonym of the moth genus Euproctis
 Ela, note name, see Guidonian hand
 Ela, the feminine third-person personal pronoun in Portuguese

See also 
 Elah (disambiguation)